Bewafa is a 1952 Indian film directed by M. L. Anand, starring the hit Bollywood pair Nargis, Raj Kapoor, along with Ashok Kumar as a lead actor and he appears as a painter in the movie. It is considered one of the best films of the pair Raj Kapoor and Nargis.

Plot

It depicts the story  of a poor girl, Roopa (Nargis) who is forced by her alcoholic uncle to work. When she cannot meet her uncle's demand to earn money, she is removed from the house by her uncle, when her neighbour Raj (Raj Kapoor) comes to her aid and loans her some money. Despite that, she finds it difficult to make ends meet, and then she meets Ashok, with whom she later sells paintings, however then Raj reenters her life. The story follows the love triangle between Roopa, Raj and Ashok.

Cast
 Ashok Kumar as Ashok
 Raj Kapoor as Raj
 Nargis as Roopa
 Neelam as Neeli
 Bhudo Advani as Advani

Soundtrack 
Lyrics written by Sarshar and Sardul Kwatra.

References 

1952 films
Indian romance films
1950s Hindi-language films
Films scored by A. R. Qureshi
1950s romance films
Hindi-language romance films
Indian black-and-white films